Lawrence Raymond Brink (September 12, 1923 – August 7, 2016) was an American football defensive end who played seven seasons in the National Football League (NFL).

Early life and education
Brink was born in Milaca, Minnesota on September 12, 1923, to Garrett and Anna (Ruis) Brink.  He attended Foley High School in Foley, Minnesota.  After military service in World War II, Brink went to Northern Illinois University, where he played college football for the Huskies from 1945 to 1947.  He played with three other future NFL players on the 1946 team that won the Illinois Intercollegiate Athletic Conference championship with an 8–2 record.  The team went on to the Turkey Bowl, losing to Evanston in the Huskies' first post-season game.  He graduated in 1948 with a B.S. in education.  In 1978, he was one of the charter inductees of the NIU Athletics Hall of Fame. He died on August 7, 2016, in Redding, California.

References

1923 births
2016 deaths
American football defensive ends
Chicago Bears players
Los Angeles Rams players
Northern Illinois Huskies football players
Western Conference Pro Bowl players
United States Army Air Forces personnel of World War II
People from Milaca, Minnesota
Players of American football from Minnesota